Ruth Myers may refer to:

Ruth A. Myers (1921–2001), American teacher
Ruth Myers (costume designer) (born 1940), British costume designer 
Ruth Myers (sculptor), artist in residence with the Southland Art Foundation
Ruth Myers, first wife of Ellis Cunliffe Lister